Venezuela men's national goalball team is the men's national team of Venezuela.  Goalball is a team sport designed specifically for athletes with a vision impairment.  The team takes part in international competitions.  

The country has held the occasional national championship for the sport.

IBSA World Games

2007 São Paulo 

The team competed in the 2007 IBSA World Games, from 28 July 2007 to 8 August 2007, in São Paulo, Brazil.  There were twenty-three men's and twelve women's teams.

The team competed in Group D with six teams.  The team was mercied by Brazil 10:0, by Czechoslovakia 13:3, by Germany 11:1, by Japan 10:0, and by Belgium 13:3.

Regional championships 

The team competes in the IBSA America goalball region.  The winner of the championships usually qualifies for a berth at the World Championships or the Paralympic Games.

2013 Colorado Springs 

The team competed at the 2013 Parapan American Games (which also hosted the 2013 IBSA World Youth Championships) from 11 to 14 July 2013, at Colorado Springs, Colorado, USA.  There were six men's teams: Argentina, Brazil, Canada, Puerto Rico, USA, Venezuela.  

The team came last.

2015 Toronto 

The team competed at the 2015 Parapan American Games from 8 August 2015 to 15 August 2015, at the Mississauga Sports Centre, Toronto, Ontario, Canada.  There were six men's teams: Argentina, Brazil, Canada, Puerto Rico, USA, Venezuela.  

The team did not place in the first four spots.

2017 São Paulo 

The team competed at the 2017 IBSA Goalball Americas Championships from Wednesday 29 November 2017 to Sunday 3 December 2017, at São Paulo, Brazil.  There were eight men's teams: Argentina, Brazil, Canada, Costa Rica, Mexico, Peru, USA, and Venezuela (Costa Rica were disqualified for not having the minimum number of athletes to start a game).  

Venezuela placed second-last, ahead of Peru.

2019 Lima 

The team competed at the 2019 Parapan American Games from 23 August 2019 to 1 September 2019, at the Miguel Grau Coliseum, Lima, Peru.  This championships was a qualifier for the 2020 Paralympic Games.  There were eight men's teams: Argentina, Brazil, Canada, Guatemala, Mexico, Peru, USA, Venezuela.  Athletes were Juan Cegarra, Fernando Ferrer, Carlos Linarez, Christhian Lopez, Jhonathan Rivas, and Wilmer Zambrano.  

The team took fourth place, losing to Canada, 11:13.

2022 São Paulo 

Due to the ongoing COVID-19 pandemic, the IBSA America championship moved from 6 to 13 November 2021, to 18 to 22 February 2022.  The event is being held at the Centro de Treinamento Paralímpico (Paralympic Training Center) in São Paulo.  This championships is a qualifier for the 2022 World Championships.

There are thirteen men's teams: Argentina, Brazil, Canada, Chile, Colombia, Costa Rica, Guatemala, Mexico, Nicaragua, Peru, Puerto Rico, USA, Venezuela.

See also 

 Disabled sports 
 Venezuela at the Paralympics

References 

National men's goalball teams
Venezuela at the Paralympics
Goalball in the Americas